Paraburkholderia insulsa is a Gram-negative, acidophilic, rod-shaped, arsenic-tolerant and aerobic bacterium from the genus of Burkholderia which has been isolated from the Ambitle Island on Papua New Guinea.

References

External links
Type strain of Burkholderia insulsa at BacDive -  the Bacterial Diversity Metadatabase

insulsa
Bacteria described in 2015